9/5 may refer to:
September 5 (month-day date notation)
May 9 (day-month date notation)